Gary James Holt (born 9 March 1973) is a Scottish football player and coach, who was most recently the sporting director at Falkirk. Holt first played competitively for Kilmarnock, making 138 appearances, before transferring to Norwich City, where he made 168 appearances. During his time with Kilmarnock and Norwich he also received ten caps for the Scotland national football team, scoring one goal. Later in his career, Holt also played for Nottingham Forest, Wycombe Wanderers, Colchester United and Lowestoft Town.

After his retirement from playing football, Holt joined the Norwich City Academy. He then managed Falkirk for just over a year until June 2014, when he returned to Norwich as a first-team coach. Holt was then head coach of Scottish Premiership club Livingston for over two years, until his resignation in November 2020. In January 2021, Holt returned to Falkirk as sporting director, but resigned 12 months later.

Playing career
Holt came late to professional football, having had a spell in the Army Catering Corps as a chef and played for the British Army team prior to joining Celtic. He did not play for the Bhoys' first team and moved on to Stoke City.

Kilmarnock
Holt signed for his boyhood favourites, Kilmarnock, in 1995. He excelled in the Ayrshire team's most consistent period of success since the 1960s.

Norwich City
In 2001, Norwich City paid £135,000 for Holt. He was voted Norwich City player of the year in 2001–02, when he also collected a number of fans' awards, including the Capital Canaries Player of the Season trophy. That season, Holt was a member of the Norwich team that reached the final of the Division One play-offs, losing on penalties to Birmingham City Holt played in Division One for his first three seasons with the club and helped them win promotion to the Premier League in 2004.

Nottingham Forest
Holt left Norwich to join Nottingham Forest in 2005, where he spent two years before being released at the end of the 2006–07 season. At Forest he scored three times, with goals against Weymouth in the FA Cup, Cheltenham in the league and Yeovil in the second leg of the 2007 League One play off semi final.

Later career
He subsequently signed for League Two side Wycombe Wanderers on 12 July 2007. He signed a one-year extension until July 2010 on 17 January 2009. On 28 March 2009, he lobbed Luke Daniels in the League Two match against Shrewsbury Town to score the third goal of his Wycombe Wanderers career.

For the 2009–10 season he left Wycombe to join former manager Paul Lambert at Colchester United as a player coach. However, when Lambert left for Norwich City after only three game of the season, his contract was terminated without him making a single appearance for the club. On 6 October 2009, he signed for Isthmian League club Lowestoft Town.

International career
Despite his excellent form with Kilmarnock, international recognition with Scotland initially proved elusive for Holt, who briefly explored the option of playing for Canada in 1998 and for Northern Ireland in 1999; however, it emerged that he was not eligible for either. Holt made his Scotland debut on 2 September 2000 as an 89th-minute substitute against Latvia, in a match that Scotland won 1–0. He made ten appearances in total, with his final cap coming in a 1–1 draw against Moldova in October 2004. His only international goal came in a 4–1 win against Trinidad and Tobago in May 2004.

Coaching career
In July 2010, he returned to Norwich City as assistant Academy manager. He was responsible for the coaching of City's under-12 to under-16 age groups as well as assisting the current coaching staff with reserve team matters.

Falkirk manager
Holt was appointed manager of Scottish First Division club Falkirk on 3 April 2013. Holt credited former Norwich City manager and compatriot, Paul Lambert for helping him. Holt left Falkirk in June 2014 to take a first-team coaching position at Norwich City, where he stayed for two years.

Livingston
In August 2018, he was appointed head coach of Scottish Premiership club Livingston, replacing former Scotland teammate Kenny Miller in the role. He won the Premiership manager of the month award for September 2018 and guided the relegation favourites to a ninth-place finish on their return to the Premiership.

Holt was forced to take a temporary leave of absence from his role in August 2019 when he overexerted in a gym session and contracted rhabdomyolysis, causing his blood levels to rise to dangerous levels and his skeletal muscle to begin breaking down. The 2019–20 season provided further success for Holt and Livingston, as the Lions finished in fifth place. It was the club's second-highest ever league finish, and Holt won the Premiership manager of the month award for January 2020 and was nominated for the Scottish Football Writers' Association 'Manager of the Year Award'.

After a bad start to the 2020–21 season, Holt resigned on 26 November.

Falkirk sporting director
Holt returned to Falkirk in January 2021 as their sporting director. He became interim manager in April 2021 after the departures of David McCracken and Lee Miller. He was sacked from this role one year later in January 2022.

Career statistics

Club

International

Score and result list Scotland's goal tally first, score column indicates score after Holt goal.

Managerial record

Honours
Kilmarnock
Scottish Cup: 1997

Norwich
Football League First Division: 2003–04 (English second tier)

Lowestoft Town
Isthmian League Division One North: 2009–10

Individual
Norwich City Player of the Year: 2002

References

External links

Career Information at Ex-Canaries.co.uk

1973 births
Scottish military personnel
Living people
Army Catering Corps soldiers
Association football midfielders
Celtic F.C. players
Colchester United F.C. players
Falkirk F.C. managers
Kilmarnock F.C. players
Norwich City F.C. players
Nottingham Forest F.C. players
Premier League players
Royal Engineers soldiers
Scotland international footballers
Scottish Professional Football League managers
Scottish Football League managers
Scottish Football League players
Scottish football managers
Scottish footballers
Scottish Premier League players
Footballers from Irvine, North Ayrshire
Stoke City F.C. players
English Football League players
Isthmian League players
Wycombe Wanderers F.C. players
Lowestoft Town F.C. players
Livingston F.C. managers
Falkirk F.C. non-playing staff
20th-century British Army personnel